The TEI TS1400 is a 1,400 shp turboshaft engine for rotary wing applications. It is developed by the Tusaş Engine Industries (TEI) in Turkey.

Development
The engine is developed for helicopters produced in Turkey. The "Turboshaft Engine Development Project" (TMGP), launched on 7 March 2017, aims to reduce foreign dependency while increasing indigenousness  rates. The first installment of the TEI TS1400 is planned on the TAI T625 Gökbey, a twin-engined light transport/utility helicopter developed by Turkish Aerospace Industries. The engine was introduced to the public on 11 December 2020.  It was also announced that the engine may be used for T129 ATAK attack helicopter in the future.

Specifications

Other
 30 sec. single engine power output: 
 120 sec. single engine power output: 
 Ceiling: 
 Shaft output revolution: 23,000 rpm

See also

References

2010s turboshaft engines